The Hamlin–Grand Falls Border Crossing connects the towns of Hamlin, Maine and Grand Falls, New Brunswick on the Canada–US border.  The crossing is reached by Boundaryline Road on the American side and by New Brunswick Route 218 on the Canadian side. It is the northernmost border crossing on Maine's north–south land border with New Brunswick.  In 2011, the United States replaced its border inspection facilities, which were originally built in 1964.

See also
 List of Canada–United States border crossings

References

Canada–United States border crossings
Transportation buildings and structures in Aroostook County, Maine
Madawaska County, New Brunswick
1953 establishments in Maine
1953 establishments in New Brunswick
Grand Falls, New Brunswick